Jadhikkoru Needhi  is a 1981 Tamil language action drama film, directed by S. Sankaran, starring Vijayakanth and Swapna in lead roles.

Cast 
Vijayakanth
Swapna

Soundtrack 
Soundtrack was composed by Shankar–Ganesh.
"Yetramadi Yetram" – T. M. Soundararajan, P. Susheela
"Bharatha Bhoomi" – T. M. Soundararajan
"Ondru Sernthu" – TMS, K. Latha
"Orinathu" – TMS, K. Latha, S. P. Ponnusamy, Manimala

References 

1981 films
1980s Tamil-language films
Films scored by Shankar–Ganesh
Indian action drama films
1980s action drama films